The Umuahia Township Stadium is a stadium in Umuahia Nigeria and the home ground of Abia Warriors F.C. of the Nigeria Premier League. Abia Comets F.C. also play their home games on the pitch. Capacity of the stadium is 5,000.

There have been widespread criticism because of the pitch surface which have been awful.

References

Football venues in Nigeria
Abia Warriors F.C.